Wheeler's October 1863 Raid (October 1–9, 1863) was a large cavalry raid in southeastern Tennessee during the American Civil War. Maj. Gen. Joseph Wheeler's Confederate cavalry scored a great initial success, but subsequently was roughed up by Union cavalry during its withdrawal south of the Tennessee River.

Background

After being defeated in the Battle of Chickamauga, the Union Army of the Cumberland, commanded by Maj. Gen. William S. Rosecrans, withdrew into the city of Chattanooga, Tennessee, and was besieged by Gen. Braxton Bragg's Army of Tennessee. The Federals held a rail head at Bridgeport, Alabama, but because Bragg's army occupied Lookout Mountain, they had to bring supplies into the beleaguered city by wagon. The routes along the Tennessee River were easily harassed by the Confederates, so Rosecrans had to bring most of his supplies into Chattanooga from Bridgeport along a 60-mile wagon route across Walden's Ridge. Bragg ordered Wheeler to take the bulk of his cavalry corps and disrupt Rosecrans's communications across Walden's Ridge.

Anderson's Cross Roads

Wheeler set out on October 1 with the divisions of Brig. Gen. Frank Crawford Armstrong and Maj. Gen. William T. Martin, plus part of Maj. Gen. John A. Wharton's division. He quickly broke through the screen of Brig. Gen. George Crook's 2nd Cavalry Division near Decatur, Tennessee, and rode toward Walden's Ridge. On October 2 at Anderson's Cross Roads, Wheeler surprised a train of 800 mule-drawn wagons, plus sutler's wagons. The Southern horsemen easily overwhelmed the few guards and began to carry out their orders to "kill the mules and burn the wagons." Soon, whiskey was discovered in the sutler's wagons and Wheeler's men began pillaging the wagons for new clothing and other booty. The officers were either unwilling or unable to stop what became an eight-hour orgy of plundering.

Soon, Col. Edward M. McCook arrived with his brigade of Union cavalry. In a series of skirmishes, McCook lost 70 men while recapturing 800 mules and a few wagons and inflicting 270 losses on the tipsy Southerners. Wharton rode to McMinnville, Tennessee, which was captured with a loss of 388 Federals and 23 Confederates. Meanwhile, Crook could deflect Wheeler's main body away from the supply base at Murfreesboro, Tennessee.

Farmington

By October 7, Brig. Gen. Robert Byington Mitchell concentrated McCook and Crook at Shelbyville, Tennessee. That day, Crook mauled Henry B. Davidson's brigade of Wharton near Farmington, losing 75 Federals while inflicting a loss of 310. The pursuit continued in foul weather as some elements of Union cavalry rode as many as 57 miles. Wheeler escaped across the Tennessee River on October 9 at Rogersville, Alabama, but not before another 95 of his horsemen were overwhelmed near Pulaski, Tennessee.

Aftermath

Wheeler inflicted significant damage to the Army of the Cumberland's supply line. He destroyed 500 wagons by Rosecrans's estimate and claimed killing 1,000 mules. However, during the pursuit, his command was badly roughed up by the Union horsemen, "his once proud command all but wrecked." In the face of the aggressive Northern cavalry, Brig. Gen. Phillip Roddey cut short his follow-up raid. Another planned cavalry raid by Maj. Gen. Stephen D. Lee was canceled after he found out that Wheeler's command was no longer in the field.

References
 Boatner, Mark M. III. The Civil War Dictionary. New York: David McKay, 1959. 
 Cozzens, Peter. The Shipwreck of Their Hopes: The Battles for Chattanooga. Chicago: University of Illinois Press, 1994. 
 Curry, W. L. Raid of the Confederate Cavalry Through Central Tennessee, In October 1863, Commanded by General Joseph Wheeler. A Paper Read Before the Ohio Commandery of the Loyal Legion, April 1, 1908. 1908.

Notes

1863 in Tennessee
Chattanooga campaign
Battles of the Western Theater of the American Civil War
Cavalry raids of the American Civil War
Inconclusive battles of the American Civil War
Conflicts in 1863
Military operations of the American Civil War in Tennessee
October 1863 events